Hovtun is a village in the Amasia Municipality of the Shirak Province of Armenia. The village was originally inhabited by Azerbaijanis, then Greeks, and now Armenians.

Demographics

References 

Populated places in Shirak Province